Florestal is a city in Minas Gerais, Brazil. The city belongs to the mesoregion Metropolitana de Belo Horizonte and to the microregion of Belo Horizonte.

See also
 List of municipalities in Minas Gerais

References

Municipalities in Minas Gerais